Issam Baouz (born November 30, 1990) is an Algerian footballer who plays for JA Drancy in the Championnat National 2. Besides France, he has played in Algeria.

Baouz was a member of ES Sétif's squad at the 2014 FIFA Club World Cup in Morocco.

References

External links
 
 

Living people
1993 births
Algerian footballers
Algerian Ligue Professionnelle 1 players
Championnat National 2 players
Championnat National 3 players
ES Sétif players
FC Les Lilas players
Villemomble Sports players
JA Drancy players
Association football midfielders
21st-century Algerian people